Zoellneria is a genus of fungi in the family Sclerotiniaceae.

The genus was circumscribed by Josef Velenovský in Monogr. Discom. Bohem. on page 298 in 1934.

The genus name of Zoellneria is in honour of Johann Karl Friedrich Zöllner (1834–1882), who was a German astrophysicist who studied optical illusions. He was also an early psychical investigator.

Species
As accepted by Species Fungorum;
 Zoellneria acerum 
 Zoellneria callochaetes 
 Zoellneria rosarum 

Former species;
 Z. clelandii  = Hymenotorrendiella clelandii, Helotiaceae family
 Z. eucalypti  = Hymenotorrendiella eucalypti, Helotiaceae
 Z. madsenii  = Hymenotorrendiella madsenii, Helotiaceae

References

External links
Index Fungorum

Sclerotiniaceae
Taxa named by Josef Velenovský